Michelle Gagliano is an American artist based in Scottsville, Virginia and is known for enigmatic, abstract oil paintings that depict natural forms with textural patinas, particularly of landscapes and light.

Early life and education 
She was born in Jamestown, New York to a family of Italian origin. She studied painting at North Texas State University. She has painting degree from Plymouth State University and Master of Fine Arts from American University.

Career 
She has been painting for more than 25 years. She completed residencies at Virginia Center for the Creative Arts and Chautauqua School of Art.  She has exhibited solo shows at different cities in the USA, Europe and Asia.

She is the first female artist to paint and interpret all 34 Cantos of Dante Alighieri’s "Inferno". It took her 33 weeks for her to complete her mixed media interpretation of the "Inferno" and exhibited the work in 2017.

Collections
The William King Museum of Art, Virginia Museum of Fine Arts and the American Embassy (Rome, Italy), are among the public collections holding or have held work by Gagliano.

Awards 
She received Virginia Museum of Fine Arts Fellowship award in 2017.

Selected Publications 
She has published the book

 Once Again to See the Stars: A Contemporary Vision of Dante's Inferno.

References

External links 

 Details about her work
 Official website
American painters
Oil paintings
American artists